Spang is a village in Germany, north of Trier between Bitburg and Wittich.  This village was first mentioned in 1254.  It is on one side of the Spanger brook while on the other side is the village of Dahlem.  These two villages eventually became a single municipality Spangdahlem as they are known today. The locals still refer themselves to being from Spang or Dalhem. After World War II the USAF located a currently operating fighter airbase in the area of Spangdalhem.

Many of the Spang families in the USA, Germany and South America have traced their roots to this area.  Generally speaking most people used their first names for identification as surnames where not important for identification.  In Germany when someone left their village or city they were known as "name" von (from) village i.e. Joseph von Spang was Joseph from the village of Spang.  Over time the von was dropped and the person was now known as Joseph Spang and Spang became their surname.  Earliest recorded von Spang was Nicholaus von Spang who married Elizabeth  Bernardos (Sic) 18 Jan 1581 in St Gangolf Catholic church in Trier, Germany.

Villages in Rhineland-Palatinate